Torn from the Grave is a compilation album by death metal band Autopsy.

Track listing
From Severed Survival
1. "Charred Remains" - 3:38
2. "Disembowel" - 4:03
3. "Gasping for Air" - 3:18
4. "Severed Survival" - 3:26
From Critical Madness demo
5. "Ridden with Disease" - 4:40
Previously unreleased track
6. "Service for a Vacant Coffin" (Live) - 3:30
Recorded live in Bramberg, Germany, 1990
From Retribution for the Dead
7. "Retribution for the Dead" - 3:53
Previously unreleased track
8. "Robbing the Grave" (Live) - 3:52
Recorded live at The Waters Club, San Pedro, CA, March 30, 1991
From Mental Funeral
9. "Twisted Mass of Burnt Decay" - 2:14
10. "Fleshcrawl" - 0:35
11. "Torn from the Womb" - 3:18
12. "Slaughterday" - 4:04
13. "Dark Crusade" - 3:54
14. "Mental Funeral" - 0:36
From Fiend for Blood

15. "Fiend for Blood" - 0:25
16. "Squeal Like A Pig" - 3:42
From the compilation Peaceville Vol. 4
17. "Funereality" - 2:51
From Acts of the Unspeakable
18. "An Act of the Unspeakable" - 2:25
19. "Frozen with Fear" - 0:30
20. "Spinal Extraction" - 0:21
21. "Death Twitch" - 2:13
22. "Walls of the Coffin" - 1:17
Previously unreleased track
23. "Shiteater" (Live) - 2:15
Recorded live at Bonnie's, New Jersey
From Shitfun
24. "Humiliate your Corpse" - 3:27
25. "Brain Damage" - 1:17
26. "Blood Orgy" - 3:23
27. "Bowel Ripper" - 1:12

Autopsy (band) albums
2001 compilation albums